State University of Economics and Technology, located in Kryvyi Rih, Ukraine was founded in 1966 as faculty of Donetsk Institute of Soviet Trade. In 1977 it became part of Kyiv National Economic University.

In 2011-2016 Cabinet of Ukraine founded Kryvyi Rih National University by uniting Kryvyi Rih Technic University, Kryvyi Rih State Pedagogical University, Kryvyi Rih Economic Institute and Kryvyi Rih Metallurgical Institute of National Metallurgical Academy of Ukraine.

In 2020, it was reorganized as the Kryvyi Rih State University of Economics and Technology (after merging the Kryvyi Rih Institute of Economics with the Kryvyi Rih Metallurgical Institute of the National Metallurgical Academy of Ukraine).

Schools / Faculties
These are the 5 faculties into which the university is divided:

 Economics Institute
 Technological Institute
 Faculty Of Information Technology
 Juridical Faculty
 Institute Of Management And Business Education

References

Educational institutions established in 2011
Universities and colleges in Kryvyi Rih
Universities in Ukraine
2011 establishments in Ukraine